Jacob Anthony Marsden (born 14 October 1996) is an English footballer who plays for Chelmsford City as a goalkeeper.

Career
Born in Great Yarmouth, Marsden played youth football for Ipswich Town, joining them in 2010, and spending a loan spell with Leiston.

After being released by Ipswich he played in non-league football for St Ives Town and Mildenhall Town.

Marsden signed for Scottish club Hamilton Academical in August 2018. He left Hamilton in May 2019.

On 28 December 2019, Marsden signed for Southern League Premier Division Central side Needham Market.

On 25 September 2020, Chelmsford City announced the signing of Marsden, with Marsden being dual-registered with Heybridge Swifts upon his arrival at the club. On 9 April 2021, Chelmsford announced Marsden had signed a new one-year contract extension at the club.

Career statistics

References

1996 births
Living people
English footballers
Ipswich Town F.C. players
Leiston F.C. players
St Ives Town F.C. players
Mildenhall Town F.C. players
Hamilton Academical F.C. players
Needham Market F.C. players
Chelmsford City F.C. players
Heybridge Swifts F.C. players
Scottish Professional Football League players
Southern Football League players
Association football goalkeepers